The Hong Kong Science Museum is a science museum in Tsim Sha Tsui East, Kowloon, Hong Kong, located next to the Hong Kong Museum of History.

History
The Hong Kong Science Museum was first conceived by the Urban Council in 1976. The council hired American firm E. Verner Johnson and Associates in 1984 to help plan the museum. Three more design firms were later engaged to work on the exhibits: West Office Design, Toshihiko Sakow Associates, and Levy Design. In 1986, the council hired Hong Kong architecture firm Palmer and Turner to design the museum. It was built by Leighton Contractors (Asia) Limited.

Construction began in March 1988 and was completed in November 1990. The museum cost HK$340 million. It was officially opened by Governor David Wilson and Urban Council Chairman H.M.G. Forsgate on 18 April 1991.

In 2000, the Urban Council was disbanded, and management of the museum became the responsibility of the newly formed Leisure and Cultural Services Department.

Exhibits

The museum has Cathay Pacific's first DC-3 airliner suspended from the ceiling.

The most popular exhibition items for children are a computer area, a real (but stationary) car in which visitors can attempt to drive in a driving simulation while avoiding accidents, speeding, and excessive fuel usage, and a small life-sized stationary aircraft with a video of a flight around Hong Kong playing inside the cockpit. Refreshments are provided at a small cafe.

About 500 exhibits are displayed in the permanent exhibition area. The most prominent exhibit is the 22-metre-high twin-tower Energy Machine which is the largest of its kind in the world. A total of 18 galleries cover a wide range of science and technology topics including light, sound, motion, electricity and magnetism, mathematics, life science, geography, meteorology, computer, transportation, communication, food science, energy/energy conservation and home technology. About 80 per cent of the exhibits are participatory so that visitors may learn through direct involvement.

The museum staff also performs live demonstrations daily, many of which are designed for younger visitors.

Transportation
The museum is within walking distance of Hung Hom station of the Mass Transit Railway (MTR).

See also 
 Hong Kong Science Park
 Hong Kong Space Museum
 List of buildings and structures in Hong Kong
 List of museums in Hong Kong

References

External links

 

1991 establishments in Hong Kong
Science Museum
Museums established in 1991
Science museums in Hong Kong